Elliott Lydell "Dale" Davis (born March 25, 1969) is an American former professional basketball player who played center and power forward.

Davis was drafted by the Indiana Pacers with the 13th pick of the 1991 NBA Draft and spent the first nine years of his career with them. He quickly established himself as the team's starting power forward and was the workhorse of the Pacers' outstanding teams in the mid-1990s. He routinely averaged double-digits in points and near double-digits in rebounds throughout his Pacers career and left the franchise as the team's all-time rebounds leader in their NBA era. (The Pacers were an original member of the American Basketball Association for several years before joining the NBA.)

Following the 1999–2000 season, in which Davis was named to the All-Star team and the Pacers made it to the NBA Finals, the organization decided it was time to rebuild with a younger group of players. They traded Davis to the Portland Trail Blazers in exchange for Jermaine O'Neal and Joe Kleine, and O'Neal soon went on to become the Pacers' franchise player.

Davis spent four years with the Blazers, putting up much the same numbers as he did with the Pacers—roughly 8 points and 8 rebounds per game. He played 313 games for the Blazers, starting 235 times.

On July 20, 2004, the Blazers traded Davis and Dan Dickau to the Golden State Warriors in exchange for Nick Van Exel.

On February 24, 2005, Davis was traded again, along with guard Speedy Claxton, to the New Orleans Hornets for guard Baron Davis. Davis was released soon afterward and signed with his first team, the Pacers, on March 4, 2005. He immediately started in place of the injured Jermaine O'Neal, earning one point, seven rebounds and two blocked shots in a Pacers' road victory against the Blazers.

In all, Davis started all 25 games he played for the Pacers in the 2004–05 regular season, contributing 6.9 points, 8.9 rebounds and 1.32 blocks per game.

In June 2006, he became a co-owner in the NASCAR NEXTEL Cup Series when he bought interest in R&J Racing.

On August 26, 2005, Davis signed as a free agent with the Detroit Pistons. He played with the Pistons for 2 years, retiring from basketball after the 2006–2007 NBA season.

In August 2006, Davis was shocked with a stun gun as Miami Beach police arrested him for assaulting a police officer, disorderly conduct, and resisting arrest. In December 2006, Davis was acquitted of all charges.

NBA career statistics

Regular season 

|-
| align="left" | 1991–92
| align="left" | Indiana
| 64 || 23 || 20.3 || .552 || .000 || .572 || 6.4 || .5 || .4 || 1.2 || 6.2
|-
| align="left" | 1992–93
| align="left" | Indiana
| 82 || 82 || 27.6 || .568 || .000 || .529 || 8.8 || .8 || .8 || 1.8 || 8.9
|-
| align="left" | 1993–94
| align="left" | Indiana
| 66 || 64 || 34.7 || .529 || .000 || .527 || 10.9 || 1.5 || .7 || 1.6 || 11.7
|-
| align="left" | 1994–95
| align="left" | Indiana
| 74 || 70 || 31.7 || .563 || .000 || .533 || 9.4 || .8 || 1.0 || 1.6 || 10.6
|-
| align="left" | 1995–96
| align="left" | Indiana
| 78 || 77 || 33.6 || .558 || .000 || .467 || 9.1 || 1.0 || .7 || 1.4 || 10.3
|-
| align="left" | 1996–97
| align="left" | Indiana
| 80 || 76 || 32.4 || .538 || .000 || .428 || 9.7 || .7 || .8 || 1.0 || 10.4
|-
| align="left" | 1997–98
| align="left" | Indiana
| 78 || 78 || 27.9 || .548 || .000 || .465 || 7.8 || .9 || .7 || 1.1 || 8.0
|-
| align="left" | 1998–99
| align="left" | Indiana
| 50 || 50 || 27.5 || .533 || .000 || .618 || 8.3 || .4 || .4 || 1.1 || 8.0
|-
| align="left" | 1999–00
| align="left" | Indiana
| 74 || 72 || 28.7 || .502 || .000 || .685 || 9.9 || .9 || .7 || 1.3 || 10.0
|-
| align="left" | 2000–01
| align="left" | Portland
| 81 || 43 || 26.7 || .479 || .000 || .632 || 7.5 || 1.3 || .5 || .9 || 7.2
|-
| align="left" | 2001–02
| align="left" | Portland
| 78 || 77 || 31.4 || .510 || .000 || .708 || 8.8 || 1.2 || .8 || 1.1 || 9.5
|-
| align="left" | 2002–03
| align="left" | Portland
| 78 || 78 || 29.3 || .541 || .000 || .633 || 7.2 || 1.2 || .7 || .9 || 7.4
|-
| align="left" | 2003–04
| align="left" | Portland
| 76 || 37 || 22.1 || .473 || .000 || .613 || 5.2 || .9 || .6 || .8 || 4.4
|-
| align="left" | 2004–05
| align="left" | Golden State
| 36 || 3 || 16.0 || .413 || .000 || .579 || 4.3 || .6 || .4 || .9 || 3.1
|-
| align="left" | 2004–05
| align="left" | Indiana
| 25 || 25 || 29.2 || .536 || .000 || .623 || 8.9 || 1.0 || .8 || 1.3 || 6.9
|-
| align="left" | 2005–06
| align="left" | Detroit
| 28 || 2 || 6.4 || .375 || .000 || .533 || 1.9 || .2 || .0 || .3 || .9
|-
| align="left" | 2006–07
| align="left" | Detroit
| 46 || 6 || 10.1 || .446 || .000 || .654 || 3.0 || .3 || .2 || .7 || 1.8 
|- class="sortbottom"
| style="text-align:center;" colspan="2"| Career
| 1094 || 863 || 27.1 || .530 || .000 || .562 || 7.9 || .9 || .6 || 1.2 || 8.0 
|- class=“sortbottom"
| style="text-align:center;" colspan="2"| All-Star
| 1 || 0 || 14.0 || .667 || .000 || .000 || 8.0 || 1.0 || .0 || .0 || 4.0

Playoffs 

|-
| align="left" | 1992
| align="left" | Indiana
| 3 || 0 || 23.0 || .400 || .000 || .000 || 6.3 || .7 || .0 || 1.7 || 2.7
|-
| align="left" | 1993
| align="left" | Indiana
| 4 || 4 || 29.3 || .667 || .000 || .250 || 8.0 || 1.0 || 1.0 || 1.0 || 4.3
|-
| align="left" | 1994
| align="left" | Indiana
| 16 || 16 || 36.1 || .528 || .000 || .306 || 9.9 || .7 || 1.1 || 1.0 || 7.7
|-
| align="left" | 1995
| align="left" | Indiana
| 17 || 17 || 28.8 || .533 || .000 || .489 || 8.0 || .4 || .4 || .8 || 7.9
|-
| align="left" | 1996
| align="left" | Indiana
| 5 || 5 || 36.8 || .516 || .000 || .364 || 11.2 || .8 || .6 || 1.2 || 7.2
|-
| align="left" | 1998
| align="left" | Indiana
| 16 || 16 || 29.1 || .651 || .000 || .453 || 7.5 || .8 || .3 || 1.1 || 8.8
|-
| align="left" | 1999
| align="left" | Indiana
| 13 || 13 || 30.3 || .584 || .000 || .560 || 10.2 || .8 || .8 || 1.4 || 9.1
|-
| align="left" | 2000
| align="left" | Indiana
| 23 || 23 || 31.0 || .523 || .000 || .542 || 11.4 || .7 || .5 || 1.3 || 8.3
|-
| align="left" | 2001
| align="left" | Portland
| 2 || 0 || 10.0 || .000 || .000 || .500 || 2.0 || .0 || .5 || .0 || .5
|-
| align="left" | 2002
| align="left" | Portland
| 3 || 3 || 23.3 || .273 || .000 || .500 || 6.7 || 1.3 || 1.3 || 1.0 || 2.3
|-
| align="left" | 2003
| align="left" | Portland
| 6 || 6 || 27.0 || .583 || .000 || .654 || 8.0 || 1.5 || .8 || .3 || 7.5
|-
| align="left" | 2005
| align="left" | Indiana
| 13 || 13 || 23.9 || .448 || .000 || .680 || 6.2 || .4 || .7 || .5 || 5.3
|-
| align="left" | 2006
| align="left" | Detroit
| 8 || 0 || 4.5 || .000 || .000 || .500 || 1.1 || .1 || .0 || .0 || .3
|-
| align="left" | 2007
| align="left" | Detroit
| 8 || 0 || 6.4 || .375 || .000 || .500 || 1.5 || .1 || .3 || .3 || 1.0
|- class="sortbottom"
| style="text-align:center;" colspan="2"| Career
| 137 || 116 || 26.7 || .533 || .000 || .503 || 8.0 || .6 || .6 || .9 || 6.6

Personal
Davis is the biological father of Trayce Jackson-Davis who currently is an American college basketball player for the Indiana Hoosiers of the Big Ten Conference.

References

External links
NBA.com Profile – Dale Davis

 Assault acquittal

1969 births
Living people
African-American basketball players
American men's basketball players
Basketball players from Georgia (U.S. state)
Centers (basketball)
Clemson Tigers men's basketball players
Detroit Pistons players
Golden State Warriors players
Indiana Pacers draft picks
Indiana Pacers players
Medalists at the 1989 Summer Universiade
NASCAR team owners
National Basketball Association All-Stars
People from Toccoa, Georgia
Portland Trail Blazers players
Power forwards (basketball)
Universiade gold medalists for the United States
Universiade medalists in basketball
21st-century African-American people
20th-century African-American sportspeople